David Tiller (born 30 May 1958) is a former Australian rules footballer in the South Australian National Football League (SANFL), playing for the North Adelaide Football Club.

Recruited from the Risdon Football Club in the Spencer Gulf Football League, Tiller made his SANFL debut in 1977. In 1984 he was appointed captain of the North Adelaide Football Club, and captained the club from 1984 to 1986.

He played in the North Adelaide premiership team of 1987, and was vice-captain of the club that year.

Tiller won the club's best and fairest award in both 1981 and 1984, and was awarded life membership at North Adelaide in 1986.

Tiller coached the North Adelaide Under-17s team to a premiership in 2005, and coached the South Adelaide Under-17s team for two years. He coached North Adelaide Under 16s from 2009 until 2016 for premierships in 2010, 2011 and 2013. In 1993 he was playing coach of the Broadview Football Club's premiership team in A1 Amateur League. He is also a long-serving physical education and geography teacher at Westminster School in Adelaide.

During his time with the Roosters, Tiller was regarded as having one of the longest kicks in the league. He was inducted into The North Adelaide Football Club Hall Of Fame on 11 November 2017.

References

Football Times – 1989 Year Book

External links 
Official Website of the North Adelaide Football Club
North Adelaide Football Club Life Members

North Adelaide Football Club players
People from Port Pirie
1958 births
Living people
Australian rules footballers from South Australia